Bluebirds is a Children's BBC drama most notable for featuring Barbara Windsor and Martine McCutcheon. First broadcast on 5 October 1989, the show ran for six episodes.

The cast also features regulars Isabelle Lucas, Sheila Steafel, Pauline Delaney, Graeme Lally, Sean Blowers and Lance Percival.

Synopsis

Set in London, it follows the adventures of youth group called the Bluebirds. The bluebirds try and protect their housing project from vandalism by local criminal Robbins.

Cast

Isabelle Lucas as Gertrude Landing 
Pauline Delaney as Ivy Longford 
Sheila Steafel as Anne Shreiber
Barbara Windsor as Mabel Fletcher 
Joseph Kpobie as Granville Landing 
Mark Decouteau as Leroy Anderson 
Alan Dean as Dave Parks
Martine Mccutcheon as Mandy
Martino Lazzeri as Jerry Williams
Lance Percival as Derek Proudfoot
Ron Pember as Mr Cullen 
Beryl Cooke as Mrs Jenkinson 
Dennis Edwards as Mr Jenkinson 
Sean Blowers as Bill Parks 
Grant Oatley as Robbins
Jimmy Lambert as Pete
Albert Moses as Mr Patel

References

External links

1989 British television series debuts
1989 British television series endings
1980s British children's television series
BBC children's television shows
English-language television shows
Television shows set in London